Greta is a genus of clearwing (ithomiine) butterflies, named by Arthur Francis Hemming in 1934. They are in the brush-footed butterfly family, Nymphalidae, and are found in Central America, South America, and the Caribbean.

Species
Arranged alphabetically:
 Greta alphesiboea (Hewitson, 1869)
 Greta andromica (Hewitson, [1854]) – andromica clearwing
 Greta annette (Guérin-Ménéville, [1844]) – white-spotted clearwing
 Greta cubana (Herrich-Schaeffer, 1862) – Cuban clearwing
 Greta clavijoi
 Greta depauperata (Boisduval, 1870)
 Greta dercetis (Doubleday & Hewitson, 1847)
 Greta diaphanus (Drury, [1773]) –  Antillean clearwing
 Greta enigma (Haensch, 1905)
 Greta esula (Hewitson, 1855)
 Greta gabiglooris (Brabant & Bischler, 2005) – Gabi's clearwing
 Greta gardneri (Weeks, 1901)
 Greta hermana (Haensch, 1903)
 Greta libethris (C & R Felder, 1867) – Libethris clearwing
 Greta lojana (Vitale & Bollino, 2001)
 Greta lydia (Weymer, 1899)
 Greta morgane (Geyer, 1833) – thick-tipped greta, Morgane clearwing, rusty clearwing
 Greta nero (Hewitson, 1854) – Nero clearwing
 Greta ochretis (Haensch, 1903)
 Greta oneidodes (Kaye, 1918)
 Greta ortygia (Weymer, 1890) – orthygia clearwing
 Greta oto (Hewitson, 1854) – glasswing
 Greta polissena (Hewitson, [1863]) – Polissena clearwing
 Greta telesilla (Weymer, 1899)
 Greta theudelinda (Hewitson, [1861])

References

Ithomiini
Nymphalidae of South America
Nymphalidae genera
Taxa named by Francis Hemming
Butterfly genera